Katarina Marinčič (born 25 June 1968) is a Slovene writer and literary historian. She has a PhD in French literature and teaches and is a member of the Senate at the Arts Faculty at the University of Ljubljana.

In 2002 Marinčič won the Kresnik Award for her novel Prikrita harmonija (Hidden Harmony). The novel is a family chronicle set in the period around the First World War. In 2007 she won the Fabula Award for best collection of short prose in Slovene published within the previous two years for her book O treh (About The Three).

Selected works
 Tereza, novel, (1989) 
 Rožni vrt, novel, (1992) 
 Prikrita harmonija (Hidden Harmony), novel, (2001) 
 O treh (About The Three), three novellas, (2005)

References

Living people
1968 births
Kresnik Award laureates
Fabula laureates
Slovenian women short story writers
Slovenian short story writers
University of Ljubljana alumni
Academic staff of the University of Ljubljana
20th-century Slovenian women writers
20th-century Slovenian writers
21st-century Slovenian women writers
21st-century Slovenian writers